Mitchell is a city in and the county seat of Davison County, South Dakota, United States. The population was 15,660 at the 2020 census making it the sixth most populous city in South Dakota.

Mitchell is the principal city of the Mitchell Micropolitan Statistical Area, which includes all of Davison and Hanson counties.

History
The first settlement at Mitchell was made in 1879. Mitchell was incorporated in 1883. It was named for Milwaukee banker Alexander Mitchell, President of the Chicago, Milwaukee, and St. Paul Railroad (Milwaukee Road).

Geography
Mitchell is located at  (43.713896, -98.026282), on the James River.

Mitchell has been assigned the ZIP code 57301 and the FIPS place code 43100.

Climate

Mitchell has a humid continental climate, the Upper Midwest, with cold winters and warm sometimes humid summers. Average daytime summer temperatures range from 86 °F (30 °C) during the day, and 62 °F (16 °C) during the night, and winter daytime temperatures average 26 °F (-3 °C) during the day, and 4 °F ( -15 °C) during the night. Most of the precipitation falls during the summer months, the wettest month being June, with an average of 3.52 inches (89.4 mm) of rain, and the driest month is January, with only 0.47 inches (11.9 mm) of rain. Mitchell is located in Tornado Alley, so thunderstorms, often spawning tornadoes, can be expected.

Demographics

2010 census
As of the census of 2010, there were 15,254 people, 6,696 households, and 3,641 families living in the city. The racial makeup of the city was 93.6% White, 0.5% African American, 3.0% Native American, 0.5% Asian, 0.1% Pacific Islander, 0.6% from other races, and 1.8% from two or more races. Hispanic or Latino of any race were 1.7% of the population.

There were 6,696 households, of which 26.4% had children under the age of 18 living with them, 41.1% were married couples living together, 9.5% had a female householder with no husband present, 3.7% had a male householder with no wife present, and 45.6% were non-families. 38.3% of all households were made up of individuals, and 15.7% had someone living alone who was 65 years of age or older. The average household size was 2.16 and the average family size was 2.88.

The median age in the city was 36.8 years. 22.6% of residents were under the age of 18; 12.5% were between the ages of 18 and 24; 22.8% were from 25 to 44; 23.9% were from 45 to 64; and 18.2% were 65 years of age or older. The gender makeup of the city was 48.8% male and 51.2% female.

2000 census
As of the census of 2000, there were 14,558 people, 6,121 households, and 3,599 families living in the city. The population density was 1,475.7 people per square mile (569.5/km2). There were 6,555 housing units at an average density of 664.4 per square mile (256.4/km2). The racial makeup of the city was 95.63% White, 0.32% African American, 2.40% Native American, 0.45% Asian, 0.03% Pacific Islander, 0.29% from other races, and 0.87% from two or more races. Hispanic or Latino of any race were 0.77% of the population.

There were 6,121 households, out of which 28.9% had children under the age of 18 living with them, 46.6% were married couples living together, 9.1% had a female householder with no husband present, and 41.2% were non-families. 34.3% of all households were made up of individuals, and 15.0% had someone living alone who was 65 years of age or older. The average household size was 2.27 and the average family size was 2.95.

In the city, the population was spread out, with 24.1% under the age of 18, 13.4% from 18 to 24, 25.3% from 25 to 44, 19.6% from 45 to 64, and 17.6% who were 65 years of age or older. The median age was 36 years. For every 100 females, there were 91.9 males. For every 100 females age 18 and over, there were 89.4 males.

As of 2000 the median income for a household in the city was $31,308, and the median income for a family was $43,095. Males had a median income of $30,881 versus $20,794 for females. The per capita income for the city was $17,888. About 8.8% of families and 12.8% of the population were below the poverty line, including 12.7% of those under age 18 and 10.9% of those age 65 or over.

Attractions

Mitchell is home of the Corn Palace. The Corn Palace is decorated with several colors of dried corn and grains, creating murals. The theme of the external murals is changed yearly at fall harvest; internal murals are changed approximately every ten years. The building itself is used for several purposes including a basketball arena, the local high school prom, trade shows, staged entertainment, and the Shriner's Circus.

Mitchell is also the home of the Dakota Discovery Museum, whose mission is to present and preserve the history of the prairie and the people who settled it.  The museum covers the time period from 1600, when the Native Americans were still largely undiscovered, to 1939, the end of the Great Depression.  The museum holds one of the most complete and pristine collections of American Indian quill and bead-works.  The Dakota Discovery Museum also features artists such as Harvey Dunn, James Earle Fraser, Charles Hargens and Oscar Howe.  In the village area behind the main building are four authentic historical buildings, including an 1885 one-room school house and the fully furnished 1886 Victorian-Italianate home of the co-founder of the Corn Palace, Louis Beckwith.  Two new features of the museum are Discovery Land, a hands-on activity area for children ages five to ten, and the Heritage Gardens Project, which brings indigenous plants to the gardens surrounding the museum and historical buildings.

The Mitchell Prehistoric Indian Village, an archaeological site where scientists are excavating a Native American village, is another attraction in the city. The site, near Lake Mitchell, is believed to have been occupied by ancestors of the present-day Mandan, who now reside in North Dakota.  The excavation is unique in that it is enclosed by an Archeodome, a climate-controlled building built over the site, which allows scientists to continue their excavation work year-round.

The Mitchell area also boasts several state champion trees: Black Cherry, Black Locust, Siberian Elm, and Tulip Tree.

Mitchell was featured in the seventeenth episode of the Small Town News Podcast, an improv comedy podcast that takes listeners on a fun and silly virtual trip to a small town in America each week, in which the hosts improvise scenes inspired by local newspaper stories.

Education
The campus of Dakota Wesleyan University is located in southwest Mitchell.

Sports
The South Dakota Gold was a professional basketball club that competed in the International Basketball Association in the 2000–01 season.

Media

AM Radio

FM Radio

Newspaper
The Mitchell Republic is Mitchell's twice weekly print and daily e-paper, owned by the Forum Communications Company.

Notable people

 Ordell Braase, former NFL player and broadcaster
 Israel Greene, adjutant of the Confederate Marine Corps
 James S. Hyde, biophysicist
 Dusty Johnson, US Congressman, former PUC Commissioner, and chief of staff to the Governor
 John Bailey Jones, retired United States federal judge
 Mike Miller, former NBA basketball player, was 2000-01 NBA Rookie of the Year, 2005–06 NBA Sixth Man of the Year Award winner and a two-time NBA champion.
 George McGovern, former Representative and Senator from South Dakota and 1972 Democratic nominee for President, grew up in Mitchell, and lived there until his death in 2012.
 Adam Morrison, basketball player, briefly lived in Mitchell as a young child while his father was coaching at Dakota Wesleyan.
 Gary Owens, voice actor and Disc Jockey
 David Rumelhart, Cognitive Psychologist who co-developed key neural network AI method Backpropagation with Geoffrey Hinton and Ronald J. Williams
 Howard Rushmore, journalist and investigative reporter
 Leonard "Bud" Williams, Veteran of WWII, the Korean War, the Vietnam War, retired as a Lt. Colonel from the US Army, prior to serving eight years as mayor. https://sdexcellence.org/Leonard_(Bud)_Williams_1993

References

External links

 Mitchell, SD government website
 Mitchell Daily Republic - Local newspaper
 Vintage Postcards of Mitchell
 

 
Cities in South Dakota
Cities in Davison County, South Dakota
County seats in South Dakota
Micropolitan areas of South Dakota